The Jefferson City Formation or Jefferson City Dolomite is a geologic formation in the Ozarks of Missouri and Arkansas. The Jefferson City is in part not differentiated from the Cotter Formation of northern Arkansas. It preserves fossils dating back to the Ordovician period.

See also

 List of fossiliferous stratigraphic units in Missouri
 Paleontology in Missouri

References

 

Ordovician Arkansas
Ordovician Missouri
Ordovician geology of Oklahoma
Ordovician System of North America
Geologic formations of Missouri
Geologic formations of Oklahoma
Landforms of the Ozarks
Ordovician southern paleotemperate deposits
Ordovician southern paleotropical deposits